Gyan Kumari Chhantyal (1953/1954 – 1 July 2020) was a member of 2nd Nepalese Constituent Assembly. She won Baglung–3 seat in CA assembly, 2013 from Nepali Congress. Gyan was born in Tamankhola rural Municipality-5 of Baglung,

Death 
Gyan Kumari was admitted to Sahid Gangalal National Heart Centre in Kathmandu where she died on 1 July 2020 morning. She was 66. Gyan underwent heart surgery on June 28 after three out of the four valves blocked in her heart. Gyan's funeral rites will be performed at Pashupati Aryaghat on 1 July, 2020.

References

Nepali Congress politicians from Gandaki Province
1950s births
2020 deaths
Year of birth missing
Nepal MPs 2017–2022
Members of the 2nd Nepalese Constituent Assembly